In the Hands of a Brute is a 1914 American silent film produced by Sid Films and distributed by Warner's Features. It was directed by Sidney Olcott with himself, Valentine Grant, and Arthur Donaldson in the leading roles.

Cast
 Valentine Grant - Nell 
 Arthur Donaldson -
 James Vincent - Walter Roberts
 Walter Chapin - 
 Roy Cheldon -
 Sidney Olcott -

Production notes
The film was shot in Jacksonville, Fla.

External links

  In the Hands of a Brute website dedicated to Sidney Olcott

1914 films
American silent short films
Films directed by Sidney Olcott
1914 drama films
Silent American drama films
American black-and-white films
1910s American films